Phoenix Airways is an inter-Caribbean airline based in Basseterre, Saint Kitts. The airline flies from St. Kitts to several destinations, including Aruba, Barbados, Dominican Republic and Tortola.

Operations
The airline began operations in July 2014. By the end of the month, press reports indicated that the airline was experiencing smaller loads than expected.  In August the airline acknowledged that this had led to flight cancellations and to the use of smaller planes, meaning that some passengers were unable to board their flights.

In March 2015, the company's CEO was arrested by the Barbados Fraud Squad.

Destinations
Phoenix Airways announced that it would serve the following destinations in August 2014 :

Timeshare Packages
The airline offered timeshare packages that also include an ownership share in the airline.

Fleet
The airline said it would operate the following aircraft:

References

Airlines established in 2014
Companies of Saint Kitts and Nevis
2014 establishments in Saint Kitts and Nevis